John Ibrahim (born 8 January 1944) is  a former Australian rules footballer who played with North Melbourne in the Victorian Football League (VFL).  He was captain-coach of Sunshine in the 1970 VFA season.

References

External links 		
		
		

	
1944 births
Living people
Australian rules footballers from Victoria (Australia)		
North Melbourne Football Club players
Ivanhoe Amateurs Football Club players
Sunshine Football Club (VFA) players
Sunshine Football Club (VFA) coaches